Jalan Besar Stadium, officially the Jalan Besar ActiveSG Stadium, is a football stadium located in Kallang, Singapore. The stadium is part of the Jalan Besar Sports and Recreation Centre, a community sports facility that includes the stadium as well as a swimming complex.

It is the home ground of the Singapore Premier League club Young Lions. The stadium is also used as an alternative home ground to the National Stadium by the Singapore national football team. The Football Association of Singapore (FAS) is also headquartered within the stadium.

Location
Jalan Besar Stadium is located along Tyrwhitt Road, within the close proximity of the major road Jalan Besar, hence its name.

History

Opening
The original stadium was opened on Boxing Day 1929 by president of the Municipal Commission of Singapore, R. J. Farrer, with the nearby Farrer Park named after him. It is considered to be the birthplace of Singapore football. Malaya Cup matches were played at the stadium from 1932 to 1966, and Malaysia Cup matches from 1967 to 1973.

Japanese occupation
During the Japanese Occupation, the stadium was one of the Sook Ching mass screening sites orchestrated by Japanese officials. During the war, the stadium remained opened and was also used as a language centre to teach the Japanese language to locals.

Post-war
On 12 November 1956, the United States men's national soccer team (USMNT) for the 1956 Summer Olympics played an exhibition game against the Singapore team at the Jalan Besar Stadium.

On 30 May 1964, a mass rally led by Singaporean statesman Lee Kuan Yew was held at the stadium to mourn and honour the death of Indian statesman Jawaharlal Nehru, whom Lee considered "a staunch friend" during the decolonisation era after World War II. Nehru had previously spoke at the stadium when he visited the country in June 1950, calling for "peace and conciliation" in the region while decolonisation was underway.

The stadium was also host to many major events in Singapore's history, such as being the venue for the first Singapore Youth Festival in 1955, the first Singapore Armed Forces Day in 1969, and the 1984 National Day Parade.

Redevelopment
In December 1999, the original stadium was closed for rebuilding. The new stadium was opened later in June 2003 with a seating capacity of 6,000. The position of the pitch was retained in the exact position as the previous stadium.

On 24 July 2010, Burnley F.C. played against a Singapore Selection side in the FIS Asian Challenge Cup held at the stadium. The Singapore side narrowly lost the game 0–1. That same year during the 2010 Summer Youth Olympics held in Singapore, the stadium was the designated venue for both the boys' and girls' football tournament.

As part of the LionsXII's sponsorship by Kingsmen, a local fan club, the King George's Stand was built in 2012 using a removable stand, increasing the stadium's capacity to 8,000.

On 30 October 2012, an LED scoreboard was implemented at the Gallery stand to provide better quality video to the spectators, allowing replay video highlights of the action on the field during matchdays. Two new screens were also placed at the two ends of the Grandstand, North and South, to enable better match experience for the Gallery fans.

On 22 May 2013, Atlético Madrid played against a Singapore Selection side in the Peter Lim Charity Cup held at the stadium. The game ended 0–2 to the away team.

Turf
Since 2006, the Jalan Besar Stadium has used artificial turf for its pitch. That year, the stadium's pitch was laid with a "FIFA 1 Star Recommended Turf", an artificial turf. The cost of relaying the pitch had cost approximately $1 million. In 2008, the stadium's pitch was relaid again at the cost of an additional $500,000, with a "FIFA 2 Star Recommended Turf", an improved quality artificial turf. The cost of re-turfing was sponsored by FIFA in collaboration with the Football Association of Singapore (FAS).

In 2014, the pitch was relaid to ensure maintenance of the turf. In 2021, the pitch was relaid with a GreenFields Evolution Pro 40 pitch, which is softer than the previous turfs. It consists of a durable shock pad underneath the playing surface, enhancing the compactness and reduce the hardness of the pitch.

Transport

Mass Rapid Transit
Jalan Besar Stadium is located near to Lavender MRT station on the East West Line (EWL) and Bendemeer MRT station on the Downtown Line (DTL). Despite its name, the stadium's location is closer to the latter station on the DTL rather than Jalan Besar MRT station.

International fixtures

See also

2006 AFC U-17 Championship
List of stadiums in Singapore
Peter Lim Charity Cup

References

External links 
Singapore Sports Council website page on the Jalan Besar Stadium
Sharon Seow, "Exploring Jalan Besar", Voices@Central Singapore Issue No. 35, Jul/Aug 2007.

Sports venues in Singapore
Football venues in Singapore
Kallang
Sports venues completed in 1932
Venues of the 2010 Summer Youth Olympics
Youth Olympic football venues
LionsXII
Singapore Premier League venues
Young Lions FC
20th-century architecture in Singapore